A total solar eclipse occurred on August 12, 1654. A solar eclipse occurs when the Moon passes between Earth and the Sun, thereby totally or partly obscuring the image of the Sun for a viewer on Earth. A total solar eclipse occurs when the Moon's apparent diameter is larger than the Sun's, blocking all direct sunlight, turning day into darkness. Totality occurs in a narrow path across Earth's surface, with the partial solar eclipse visible over a surrounding region thousands of kilometres wide.

Observations and history 

The eclipse occurred during the Battle of Shklow (1654).

Related eclipses 
It is a part of solar Saros 120.

Eclipse in art 
 De Eclipsi solari anno M. DC. LIV., die XII. augusti, in Europa a pluribus spectata tubo optico, satirical writing by Jakob Balde (1662).

See also 
 List of solar eclipses visible from the United Kingdom 1000–2090 AD

References

 NASA chart graphics
 Googlemap
 NASA Besselian elements

1654 08 12
1654 in science
1654 08 12